German submarine U-1170 was a Type VIIC/41 U-boat of Nazi Germany's Kriegsmarine during World War II.

She was ordered on 2 April 1942, and was laid down on 30 April 1943, at Danziger Werft AG, Danzig, as yard number 142. She was launched on 14 October 1943, and commissioned under the command of Oberleutnant zur See Friedrich Justi on 1 March 1944.

Design
German Type VIIC/41 submarines were preceded by the heavier Type VIIC submarines. U-1170 had a displacement of  when at the surface and  while submerged. She had two shafts and two  propellers.

U-1170 was fitted with five  torpedo tubes (four fitted at the bow and one at the stern), fourteen torpedoes or 26 TMA or TMB Naval mines, one  SK C/35 naval gun, (220 rounds), one  Flak M42 and two  C/30 anti-aircraft guns. The boat had a complement of between forty-four and fifty-two.

Service history
The wreck was later broken up.

See also
 Battle of the Atlantic

References

Bibliography

German Type VIIC/41 submarines
U-boats commissioned in 1944
World War II submarines of Germany
1943 ships
Ships built in Danzig
Operation Regenbogen (U-boat)
Maritime incidents in May 1945
U-boats scuttled in 1945